Terry Kleffman is an American curler. Kleffman was the third on a team out of Hibbing Curling Club in Hibbing, Minnesota which won the US National Championship two times, in 1959 and 1962. The team was mostly family, consisting of Kleffman's father Fran Kleffman at second and brother-in-law Dick Brown at skip. The only non-family member was Nick Jerulle at lead.  In 1962 the team went on to represent the United States at the World Championship, which was then called the 1962 Scotch Cup. This was only the second time the United States had competed in the Championship. Kleffman's team finished with a 4-2 record, good enough to earn them the silver medal.

References

External links
 

Living people
Year of birth missing (living people)
American male curlers
American curling champions